Hartsfield–Jackson Atlanta International Airport , also known as Atlanta Hartsfield–Jackson International Airport, Atlanta Airport, Hartsfield, Hartsfield–Jackson and, formerly, as the Atlanta Municipal Airport, is the primary international airport serving Atlanta, Georgia, United States. It is named after former Atlanta mayors William B. Hartsfield and Maynard Jackson. With over 93 million passengers, Hartsfield-Jackson has been the world's busiest airport by passenger traffic since 1998, except when it briefly lost its title in 2020 due to the effect of the COVID-19 pandemic in the United States but regained it in 2021.
 
Hartsfield–Jackson is the primary hub of Delta Air Lines. With just over 1,000 flights a day to 225 domestic and international destinations, the Delta hub is the world's largest airline hub and is considered the first mega-hub in America. In addition to hosting Delta's corporate headquarters, Hartsfield–Jackson is also the home of Delta's Technical Operations Center, which is the airline's primary maintenance, repair and overhaul arm. Aside from Delta, Hartsfield-Jackson is also a focus city for low-cost carriers Frontier Airlines and Southwest Airlines. The airport has international service within North America and to Latin America, Europe, Africa, Middle East and East Asia.

The airport is mostly in unincorporated areas of Clayton County, but it spills into the city limits of Atlanta, College Park, and Hapeville, in territory extending into Fulton County. The airport's domestic terminal is served by MARTA's Red and Gold rail lines.

History

Candler Field/Atlanta Municipal Airport (1925–1961) 
Hartsfield–Jackson began with a five-year, rent-free lease on  that was an abandoned auto racetrack named The Atlanta Speedway. The lease was signed on April 16, 1925, by Mayor Walter Sims, who committed the city to develop it into an airfield. As part of the agreement, the property was renamed Candler Field after its former owner, Coca-Cola tycoon and former Atlanta mayor Asa Candler. The first flight into Candler Field was September 15, 1926, a Florida Airways mail plane flying from Jacksonville, Florida. In May 1928, Pitcairn Aviation began service to Atlanta, followed in June 1930 by Delta Air Service. Those two airlines, later known as Eastern Air Lines and Delta Air Lines, respectively, would both use Atlanta as their chief hubs. The airport's weather station became the official location for Atlanta's weather observations on September 1, 1928, and records by the National Weather Service.

Atlanta was a busy airport from its inception, and by the end of 1930, it was third behind New York City and Chicago for regular daily flights with sixteen arriving and departing. Candler Field's first control tower opened March 1939. The March 1939 Official Aviation Guide shows fourteen weekday airline departures: ten Eastern and four Delta.

In October 1940, the U.S. government declared it a military airfield and the United States Army Air Forces operated Atlanta Army Airfield jointly with Candler Field. The Air Force used the airport primarily to service many types of transient combat aircraft. During World War II, the airport doubled in size and set a record of 1,700 takeoffs and landings in a single day, making it the nation's busiest in terms of flight operation. Atlanta Army Airfield closed after the war.

In 1942, Candler Field was renamed Atlanta Municipal Airport and by 1948, more than one million passengers passed through a war surplus hangar that served as a terminal building. Delta and Eastern had extensive networks from ATL, though Atlanta had no nonstop flights beyond Texas, St. Louis, and Chicago until 1961. Southern Airways appeared at ATL after the war and had short-haul routes around the Southeast until 1979.

In 1957, Atlanta saw its first jet airliner: a prototype Sud Aviation Caravelle that was touring the country arrived from Washington, D.C. The first scheduled turbine airliners were Capital Viscounts in June 1956; the first scheduled jets were Delta DC-8s in September 1959. The first trans-Atlantic flight was a Delta/Pan Am interchange DC-8 to Europe via Washington starting in 1964; the first scheduled international nonstops were Eastern flights to Mexico City and Jamaica in 1971–72. Nonstops to Europe started in 1978 and to Asia in 1992–93.

Atlanta claimed to be the country's busiest airport, with more than two million passengers passing through in 1957 and, between noon and 2p.m. each day, it became the world's busiest airport. (The April 1957 OAG shows 165 weekday departures from Atlanta, including 45 between 12:05 and 2:00 PM and 20 between 2:25 and 4:25 AM.) Chicago Midway had 414-weekday departures, including 48 between 12:00 and 2:00 PM. In 1957, Atlanta was the country's ninth-busiest airline airport by flight count and about the same by passenger count.

Original Jet Terminal (1961–1980) 
In late 1957, work began on a new $21 million terminal, which opened on May 3, 1961. Consisting of six pier concourses radiating from a central building, the terminal was the largest in the country and could handle over six million travelers a year; the first year, nine and a half million people passed through.

In 1971, the airport was named William B. Hartsfield Atlanta Airport after former Atlanta mayor William B. Hartsfield who died that year. The name change took effect on February 28, which would have been Hartsfield's 81st birthday. Later that year, in recognition of the growth of the airport's international service, the name was changed to William B. Hartsfield Atlanta International Airport.

Midfield Terminal (1980–present) 
Construction began on the present midfield terminal in January 1977 under the administration of Mayor Maynard Jackson. It was the largest construction project in the South, costing $500 million. The complex was designed by Stevens & Wilkinson, Smith Hinchman & Grylls, and Minority Airport Architects & Planners. The new terminal, initially consisting of Concourses A through D and the northern half of the present-day Concourse T (which served as the International Terminal), opened on September 21, 1980, on time and under budget. It was designed to accommodate up to 55 million passengers per year and covered 2.5 million square feet (230,000 m2). In December 1984, a  fourth parallel runway was completed, and another runway was extended to  the following year.

In 1999, Hartsfield–Jackson's leadership established the Development Program: "Focus On the Future," involving multiple construction projects to prepare the airport to handle a projected demand of 121 million passengers in 2015. The program was originally budgeted at $5.4 billion over ten years, but the total is now revised to over $9 billion.

In May 2001, construction of an over  fifth runway (10–28) began. It was completed at the cost of $1.28 billion and opened on May 27, 2006. It bridges Interstate 285 (the Perimeter) on the airport's south side, making Hartsfield–Jackson the nation's only currently active civil airport to have a runway above an interstate (although Runway 17R/35L at Stapleton International Airport in Denver, Colorado crossed Interstate 70 until that airport closed in 1995). The massive project, which involved putting fill dirt eleven stories high in some places, destroyed some surrounding neighborhoods and dramatically changed the scenery of Flat Rock Cemetery and Hart Cemetery, both on the airport property. It was added to help ease traffic problems caused by landing small- and mid-size aircraft on the longer runways used by larger planes such as the Boeing 777, which need longer runways than the smaller planes. With the fifth runway, Hartsfield–Jackson is one of only a few airports that can perform triple simultaneous landings.
The fifth runway is expected to increase the capacity for landings and take-offs by 40%, from an average of 184 flights per hour to 237 flights per hour.

Along with the fifth runway, a new control tower was built to see the entire runway length. The old control tower, at 231ft, was demolished in August 2006. 

On October 20, 2003, the Atlanta City Council voted to rename Hartsfield–Jackson Atlanta International Airport to honor former mayor Maynard Jackson, who died June 23, 2003. The council planned to drop Hartsfield's name from the airport, but public outcry prevented this.

In April 2007, an "end-around taxiway" opened, Taxiway Victor. It is expected to save an estimated $26 million to $30 million in fuel each year by allowing airplanes landing on the northernmost runway to taxi to the gate area without preventing other aircraft from taking off.

After the Southeastern U.S. drought of 2007, the airport (the state's eighth-largest water user) changed to reduce water usage. This included adjusting toilets (725 commodes and 338 urinals) and 601 sinks. (The two terminals alone use  a day.) It also stopped using firetrucks to spray water over aircraft when the pilot made the last landing before retirement (a water salute).
The city of Macon offered to sell water to the airport through a proposed pipeline.

The airport today employs about 55,300 airline, ground transportation, concessionaire, security, the federal government, the City of Atlanta, and airport tenant employees and is the largest employment center in Georgia. With a payroll of $2.4 billion, the airport has a direct and indirect economic impact of $3.2 billion on the local and regional economy and an annual regional economic impact of more than $19.8 billion.

In December 2015, the airport became the first airport in the world to serve 100 million passengers in a year.

Historical airline service 
Delta and Eastern dominated the airport during the 1970s. United, Southern, Piedmont, Northwest and TWA were also present. In 1978, after airline deregulation, United no longer served Atlanta, while Southern successor Republic was the airport's third-largest carrier.

Eastern was a larger airline than Delta until deregulation in 1978, but Delta was early to adopt the hub-and-spoke route system, with Atlanta as a hub between the Midwest and Florida, giving it an advantage in the Atlanta market. Eastern ceased operations in 1991 because of labor issues; American Airlines considered establishing an Atlanta hub around that time but decided Delta was too strong there and instead replaced Eastern's other hub in Miami. TWA created a small hub at Atlanta in 1992 but abandoned the concept in 1994 leaving Delta with a monopoly hub at Atlanta.

From the 1980s until Eastern's demise in 1991, Delta occupied ConcourseA and part of ConcourseB, Eastern occupied the remainder of ConcourseB and ConcourseC, other domestic airlines used ConcourseD, and ConcourseT was used by international flights. By the mid-1990s, Delta's hub grew to occupy all of ConcourseB and the southern half of ConcourseT, and international flights moved to the new ConcourseE.

ValuJet was established in 1993 as low-cost competition for Delta at ATL. However, its safety practices were questioned early, and the airline was grounded after the 1996 crash of ValuJet Flight 592. It resumed operations in 1997 as AirTran Airways and was the second-largest airline at ATL until it was acquired by Southwest in 2011 and absorbed into Southwest on December 28, 2014. Southwest is now the airport's second-largest carrier.

In recent years the airport has seen growth from low cost carriers such as Frontier Airlines and Spirit Airlines.

In April 2023 Ethiopian Airlines will become the first African carrier to serve the airport.

Facilities

Terminals 
Hartsfield–Jackson Atlanta International Airport has two terminals and seven concourses with a total of 192 gates. The Domestic Terminal is located on the west side of the airport and the Maynard H. Jackson Jr. International Terminal is on the east side of the airport. The terminals and concourses are connected by the Transportation Mall, a pedestrian tunnel with a series of moving walkways and The Plane Train, an automated people mover. All international arrivals are processed in Concourses E and F; Concourse F is the only concourse in the airport that has a gate that can support an Airbus A380, the largest passenger aircraft in the world. All non-Delta international carriers operate their ATL flights from this terminal, including Delta’s Skyteam partners such as Aeromexico, Air France, KLM, Korean Air and Virgin Atlantic.

Concourse T contains 21 gates.
Concourse A contains 29 gates.
Concourse B contains 32 gates.
Concourse C contains 34 gates.
Concourse D contains 40 gates.
Concourse E contains 28 gates.
Concourse F contains 12 gates.

Ground transportation 
The domestic terminal can be accessed directly from Interstate 85 at exit 72. The international terminal is accessed directly from Interstate 75 at exit 239. These freeways in turn connect with the following additional freeways within 10 miles: Interstate 285, Interstate 675, Georgia State Route 166, Interstate 20.

Hartsfield–Jackson has its own train station on the city's rapid transit system, MARTA, served by the Red and Gold lines. The above-ground station is inside in the main building, between the north and south domestic terminals on the west end. The Airport station is currently the southernmost station in the MARTA system, though expansion via metro or commuter rail further south into Clayton County have been discussed.

The Hartsfield–Jackson Rental Car Center, which opened December 8, 2009, houses all ten airport rental agencies with capacity for additional companies. The complex features 9,900 parking spaces split between two four-story parking decks that together cover , a  customer service center, and a maintenance center featuring 140 gas pumps and 30 wash bays equipped with a water recovery system. An automated people mover, the ATL SkyTrain, runs between the rental car center, the Domestic Terminal, and the Gateway Center of the Georgia International Convention Center, while a four-lane roadway that spans Interstate 85 connects the rental car center with the existing airport road network.

Other facilities 

The 990 Toffie Terrace hangar, a part of Hartsfield–Jackson Airport and located within the City of College Park corporate limits, is owned by the City of Atlanta. The building now houses the Atlanta Police Department Helicopter Unit. It once served as the headquarters of the regional airline ExpressJet.

Before the merger, Atlantic Southeast Airlines was headquartered in the hangar, then named the A-Tech Center. In December 2007, the airline announced it was moving its headquarters into the facility, previously named the "North Hangar." The  hangar includes  of hangar bays for aircraft maintenance. It has  of adjacent land and 1,400 parking spaces for employees. The airline planned to relocate 100 employees from Macon to the new headquarters. The Atlanta City Council and Mayor of Atlanta Shirley Franklin approved the new 25-year ASA lease, which also gave the airline new hangar space to work on 15 to 25 aircraft in overnight maintenance; previously, its aircraft were serviced at ConcourseC. The airport property division stated that the hangar was built in the 1960s and renovated in the 1970s. Eastern Air Lines and Delta Air Lines had previously occupied the hangar. Delta's lease originally was scheduled to expire in 2010, but the airline returned the lease to the City of Atlanta in 2005 as part of its bankruptcy settlement. The city collected an insurance settlement of almost $900,000 due to the cancellation.

Airlines and destinations

Passenger 

: Ethiopian Airlines flights from Addis Ababa to Atlanta stop in Dublin for refueling. The flight from Atlanta to Addis Ababa is nonstop.

Cargo

Statistics

Top destinations

Airline market share

Annual traffic

On-Time Performance (Domestic Major U.S. Carriers Only)

Accidents and incidents 
 On May 23, 1960, Delta Air Lines Flight 1903, a Convair CV-880-22-1 (N8804E), crashed on takeoff resulting in the loss of all four crew members. This flight was a training flight for two Delta captains who were being type-rated on the 880.
 On February 25, 1969, Eastern Air Lines Flight 955 was hijacked by one passenger shortly after takeoff from ATL en route to Miami. The man pulled a .22 caliber pistol and demanded to be flown to Cuba. He got off the plane in Cuba while the DC-8 was allowed to fly back to the U.S.
On April 4, 1977, Southern Airways Flight 242 was on descent to the airport when the hail was ingested into the engines, leading them to fail. Pilot errors and difficult weather forced the pilots to attempt an emergency landing on a highway. Upon touchdown, the aircraft struck several buildings and cars, killing 72 people.
 On January 18, 1990, an Eastern Air Lines Boeing 727 overran a Beechcraft King Air operated by Epps Air Service, based at another Atlanta airport. The King Air had landed and was taxiing when the 727, still at high speed in its landing roll, collided with the aircraft. The larger plane's wing impacted the roof of the smaller. The pilot of the King Air, an Epps charter pilot, was killed, while a passenger survived. No crew or passengers on the Eastern plane were injured.

See also 

 Atlanta's second airport
 Candler Field Museum
 Georgia World War II Army Airfields
 List of busiest airports by aircraft movements
 List of busiest airports by cargo traffic
 List of busiest airports by international passenger traffic
 List of busiest airports by passenger traffic
 List of the busiest airports in the United States
 World's busiest airport
 List of tallest air traffic control towers in the United States

References

External links 

 
 Hartsfield–Jackson Atlanta International Airport Official YouTube
 Atlanta Journal-Constitution 
hartsfield-jackson atlanta international airport: All you need to know
 Hartsfield Atlanta International Airport 1961–1980
 Historic photos of Atlanta Airport – Over 100 pages of historic ATL photos including dozens of vintage photos from the LIFE archive.
 Atlanta Airport Time Machine – ATL Airport historian David Henderson's Google Maps mashup featuring historical locations and associated photography.
 Atlanta airport travel data at Airportsdata.net
 Atlanta Airport Parking Guide
 Airport webcams, flight timetables & pilot data
 
 

 
Transportation in Atlanta
1926 establishments in Georgia (U.S. state)
Airports in Georgia (U.S. state)
Airports established in 1926
Transportation in Clayton County, Georgia
Buildings and structures in Fulton County, Georgia
Buildings and structures in Clayton County, Georgia
Transportation in Fulton County, Georgia
College Park, Georgia
Hapeville, Georgia